The 2015 Colorado Rapids season is the club's twentieth season of existence, and their twentieth season in Major League Soccer, the top tier of the American and Canadian soccer pyramids. The team began the season with three scoreless matches and were both the final team that failed to register a goal, and the last that did not allowed one. A loss in their fourth match extended their scoreless streak to four, and their winless streak dating back to last season to 18 matches. Both streaks ended on April 10 against FC Dallas, who the Rapids defeated 4–0.

Background

Club

Roster 
Updated August 7, 2015.

Technical Staff 
As of November 26, 2014.

Transfers

Transfers In

Transfers Out

Draft picks

Competitions

Preseason

MLS

Results by round

Standings

Western Conference standings

Overall table 

Note: the table below has no impact on playoff qualification and is used solely for determining host of the MLS Cup, certain CCL spots, and 2015 MLS draft. The conference tables are the sole determinant for teams qualifying to the playoffs

U.S. Open Cup 

Colorado will enter the 2015 U.S. Open Cup with the rest of Major League Soccer in the fourth round.

References

Colorado Rapids seasons
Colorado Rapids
Colorado Rapids
Colorado Rapids